The neighborhood of Copperfield is located in the American city of north Austin, Texas (78753)

Boundaries 
Dessau Rd. and Parmer Ln. intersection, Dessau Rd. and Shropshire/Braker Ln. Cut-off intersection, and off east Yager Ln. and Parmer Ln. intersection (by the sonic), and Copperfield Dr. and Yager Ln. crossroad.

Education
The neighborhood is in the Pflugerville Independent School District

Public schools

High schools
John B. Connally

Middle schools
Dessau

Elementary
Copperfield

Neighborhoods in Austin, Texas